By-Line: Ernest Hemingway is a 1967 collection of 77 of the articles that Ernest Hemingway wrote as a journalist between 1920 and 1956. The collection was edited by William White, a professor of English literature and journalism at Wayne State University, and a regular contributor to The Hemingway Review. By-Line: Ernest Hemingway has been translated into fourteen languages and made The New York Times Best Seller list.

Background
The 77 articles published in By-Line: Ernest Hemingway were selected from newsprint and files of magazines, and bring to light Hemingway's inimitable style, his story-telling skills and his personality.

As a reporter and foreign correspondent in Kansas City before World War I, then in Chicago, Toronto, Paris among the expatriates, the Near East, in Europe with the diplomats and statesmen, in Germany and Spain, Hemingway observed people and absorbed places like a sponge: these were later to become subject matter for his short stories and novels. Although he was also a good reporter, showing a grasp of politics, economics, and knew how to dig for information, his craft was that of fiction: his writing shows how he felt about what he saw.

Description
By-Line: Ernest Hemingway comprises five sections:
 "I. Reporting, 1920—1924" contains 29 selections from Hemingway's 154 articles in the Toronto Daily Star and Star Weekly, representing his first contributions for those papers.
 "II. Esquire, 1933—1936" has 17 selections from Hemingway's 31 monthly letters for Esquire; of the remaining 14, six were fiction and thus outside the scope of William White's collection.
 "III. Spanish Civil War, 1937—1939" features nine of the 28 North American Newspaper Alliance dispatches Hemingway cabled from Europe, plus two of the 14 articles he wrote for Ken, an anti-fascist magazine edited by Arnold Gingrich.
 "IV. World War II" is made up of eight articles written in 1941 for the short-lived, ad-less New York newspaper PM, and six reports he wrote for Collier's in 1944 as the chief of their European Bureau.
 "V. After the Wars, 1949—1956" includes a fishing article from Holiday and a hunting article from True magazine; Hemingway's own account in Look of what happened in his near fatal plane crashes in Africa in 1954; and more about himself and his writing in a later Look article of 1956.

Writing style
The editor, William White, wrote:

Legacy
By-Line: Ernest Hemingway was translated into fourteen languages and made The New York Times Best Seller list.

See also
 Dateline: Toronto (1985) – a collection of 172 articles that Hemingway wrote for the Toronto Star between 1920 and 1924.

References

Sources

Books

Journals, newspapers and magazines

Websites

Further reading

External links
 By-Line: Ernest Hemingway 1967 at openlibrary.org
 Dr. William White, professor of journalism at Wayne State University at historicimages.com

Books by Ernest Hemingway
1967 books
Works about journalism
Works about Toronto
Toronto Star
Esquire (magazine)
Works about the Spanish Civil War
Works about World War II
Charles Scribner's Sons books